The photovoltaic effect is the generation of voltage  and electric current in a material upon exposure to light. It is a physical and chemical phenomenon.

The photovoltaic effect is closely related to the photoelectric effect. For both phenomena, light is absorbed, causing excitation of an electron or other charge carrier to a higher-energy state. The main distinction is that the term photoelectric effect is now usually used when the electron is ejected out of the material (usually into a vacuum) and photovoltaic effect used when the excited charge carrier is still contained within the material. In either case, an electric potential (or voltage) is produced by the separation of charges, and the light has to have a sufficient energy to overcome the potential barrier for excitation. The physical essence of the difference is usually that photoelectric emission separates the charges by ballistic conduction and photovoltaic emission separates them by diffusion, but some "hot carrier" photovoltaic devices concepts blur this distinction.

History
The first demonstration of the photovoltaic effect, by Edmond Becquerel in 1839, used an electrochemical cell. He explained his discovery in Comptes rendus de l'Académie des sciences, "the production of an electric current when two plates of platinum or gold immersed in an acid, neutral, or alkaline solution are exposed in an uneven way to solar radiation."

The first solar cell, consisting of a layer of selenium covered with a thin film of gold, was experimented by Charles Fritts in 1884, but it had a very poor efficiency. However, the most familiar form of the photovoltaic effect uses solid-state devices, mainly in photodiodes. When sunlight or other sufficiently energetic light is incident upon the photodiode, the electrons present in the valence band absorb energy and, being excited, jump to the conduction band and become free. These excited electrons diffuse, and some reach the rectifying junction (usually a diode p–n junction) where they are accelerated into the n-type semiconductor material by the built-in potential (Galvani potential). This generates an electromotive force and an electric current, and thus some of the light energy is converted into electric energy. The photovoltaic effect can also occur when two photons are absorbed simultaneously in a process called two-photon photovoltaic effect.

Physics
In addition to the direct photovoltaic excitation of free electrons, an electric current can also arise through the Seebeck effect. When conductive or semiconductive material is heated by absorption of electromagnetic radiation, the heating can lead to increased temperature gradients in the semiconductor material or differentials between materials. These thermal differences in turn may generate a voltage because the electron energy levels are shifted differently in different areas, creating a potential difference between those areas which in turn create an electric current. The relative contributions of the photovoltaic effect versus the Seebeck effect depend on many characteristics of the constituent materials.

All above effects generate direct current, the first demonstration of the alternating current photovoltaic effect (AC PV) was done by Dr. Haiyang Zou and Prof. Zhong Lin Wang at the Georgia Institute of Technology in 2017. The AC PV effect is the generation of alternating current (AC) in the nonequilibrium states when the light periodically shines at the junction or interface of material. The AC PV effect is based on the capacitive model that the current strongly depends on the frequency of the chopper. The AC PV effect is suggested to be a result of the relative shift and realignment between the quasi-Fermi levels of the semiconductors adjacent to the junction/interface under the nonequilibrium conditions. The electrons flow in the external circuit back and forth to balance the potential difference between two electrodes. The organic solar cell, which the materials have no initial carrier concentration, does not have the AC PV effect.

Effect of the temperature

The performance of a photovoltaic module depends on the environmental conditions, mainly on the global incident irradiance G on the module plane. However, the temperature T of the p–n junction also influences the main electrical parameters: the short-circuit current ISC, the open-circuit voltage VOC, and the maximum power Pmax. The first studies about the behavior of PV cells under varying conditions of G and T date back several decades ago.1-4 In general, it is known that VOC shows a significant inverse correlation with T, whereas for ISC that correlation is direct, but weaker, so that this increment does not compensate for the decrease of VOC. As a consequence, Pmax reduces when T increases. This correlation between the output power of a solar cell and its junction working temperature depends on the semiconductor material,2 and it is due to the influence of T on the concentration, lifetime, and mobility of the intrinsic carriers, that is, electrons and holes, inside the PV cell.

The temperature sensitivity is usually described by some temperature coefficients, each one expressing the derivative of the parameter it refers to with respect to the junction temperature. The values of these parameters can be found in any PV module data sheet; they are the following:

– β Coefficient of variation of VOC with respect to T, given by ∂VOC/∂T.

– α Coefficient of variation of ISC with respect to T, given by ∂ISC/∂T.

– δ Coefficient of variation of Pmax with respect to T, given by ∂Pmax/∂T.

Techniques for estimating these coefficients from experimental data can be found in the literature. Few studies analyse the variation of the series resistance with respect to the cell or module temperature. This dependency is studied by suitably processing the current–voltage curve. The temperature coefficient of the series resistance is estimated by using the single diode model or the double diode one.

Solar cells
In most photovoltaic applications the radiation is sunlight, and the devices are called solar cells. In the case of a semiconductor p–n (diode) junction solar cell, illuminating the material creates an electric current because excited electrons and the remaining holes are swept in different directions by the built-in electric field of the depletion region. 

The AC PV is operated at the non-equilibrium conditions. The first study was based on a p-Si/TiO2 nanofilm. It is found that except for the DC output generated by the conventional PV effect based on a p–n junction, AC current is also produced when a flashing light is illuminated at the interface. The AC PV effect does not follow Ohm's law, being based on the capacitive model that the current strongly depends on the frequency of the chopper, but voltage is independent of the frequency. The peak current of AC at high switching frequency can be much higher than that from DC. The magnitude of the output is also associated with the light absorption of materials.

See also
 Theory of solar cells
 Electromotive force in solar cells
 Photoelectric effect

References

Electrical phenomena
Energy conversion
Photovoltaics
Quantum chemistry
Electrochemistry